Harlan G. "Hap" Palmer III (born October 28, 1942) is an American children's musician and guitarist from Los Angeles, California. Palmer's songs specialize in topics aimed at young children, such as math, and reading, or developing motor skills. Palmer released his first recording in 1969, and has composed over 200 songs for children. He also taught at a school for mentally challenged children starting in 1972 

His early albums include the Learning Basic Skills Through Music series, (in both English and Spanish language versions) Getting to Know Myself (which features his signature song "Sammy"), Sally the Swinging Snake, and Walter the Waltzing Worm. He released the Halloween song Witches' Brew in 1976, co-written by his then wife Martha Cheney. He also released a series of DVDs and videos called Baby Songs. He received his MA in Dance Education from UCLA in 1983 His album Multiplication Mountain was released on January 15, 2009. His 2016 release received the Parents' Choice Gold Award.

References

http://www.parents-choice.org/product.cfm?product_id=34149&StepNum=1&award=aw 
https://www.discogs.com/artist/1337227-Hap-Palmer
https://www.teachers.net/gazette/SEP08/archive/

External links 
Official Site
Baby Songs

1942 births
Living people
American children's musicians
American male singers